Mount Hope Historic District is a national historic district located at Mount Hope, Fayette County, West Virginia.  The district encompasses 144 contributing buildings, one contributing site, four contributing structures, and one contributing object.   It includes commercial and industrial buildings; public and private institutional properties; domestic architecture; Stadium Terrace, a 1939 25-unit public housing project designed by H. Rus Warne; along with roadways; historic retaining walls; a cemetery; and the Municipal Stadium. The U. S. Post Office dates to 1940 and was designed by the Office of the Supervising Architect under Louis A. Simon. Located in the district is the previously listed New River Company General Office Building.

It was listed on the National Register of Historic Places in 2007.

References

Historic districts in Fayette County, West Virginia
Houses in Fayette County, West Virginia
National Register of Historic Places in Fayette County, West Virginia
Italianate architecture in West Virginia
Colonial Revival architecture in West Virginia
Commercial buildings on the National Register of Historic Places in West Virginia
Houses on the National Register of Historic Places in West Virginia
Public housing in West Virginia
Historic districts on the National Register of Historic Places in West Virginia